Walpole Town Hall is a historic town hall building at 972 Main Street in Walpole, Massachusetts, USA. The two-story brick building was designed by J. Williams Beal and completed in 1881. The building exhibits Classical Revival with Romanesque elements. Its most prominent feature is its  square clock tower, topped by a pyramidal roof. The entrance is recessed at the base of the tower, under a large round-arch opening trimmed in brownstone.

The building was listed on the National Register of Historic Places in 1981.

See also
National Register of Historic Places listings in Norfolk County, Massachusetts

References

City and town halls on the National Register of Historic Places in Massachusetts
Government buildings completed in 1881
Buildings and structures in Norfolk County, Massachusetts
Town halls in Massachusetts
Clock towers in Massachusetts
Walpole, Massachusetts
National Register of Historic Places in Norfolk County, Massachusetts
1881 establishments in Massachusetts